Douglas Bourgeois (born 1951) is an American sculptor and figurative painter. Bourgeois has been called one of the new "visionary imagists".

Life
Bourgeois was born in Gonzales, Louisiana and grew up in St. Amant, Louisiana. He received a BFA from Louisiana State University in 1974.

Collections
Bourgeois' work is held in the following collections: 
 the Frederick R. Weisman Art Foundation (Los Angeles), 
 The Historic New Orleans Collection, 
 the Honolulu Museum of Art, the Morris Museum of Art (Augusta, GA), 
 the New Orleans Museum of Art, 
 the Ogden Museum of Southern Art (New Orleans), 
 the Smithsonian American Art Museum (Washington, DC), and 
 the Southeastern Center for Contemporary Art (Winston-Salem, NC).

Bibliography
 Arthur Roger Gallery, Douglas Bourgeois, New Orleans, Arthur Roger Gallery, 1994
 Bourgeois, Douglas, Dan Cameron, Estill Curtis Pennington, David S. Rubin and Jay Weigel, Baby-boom Daydreams, the Art of Douglas Bourgeois, New York, Hudson Hills Press, 2003 
 Delehanty, Randolph, Art in the American South, Works from the Ogden Collection, Baton Rouge, Louisiana State University Press, 1996, p. 225.

References

1951 births
20th-century American painters
American male painters
21st-century American painters
21st-century American male artists
Living people
Artists from Louisiana
20th-century American sculptors
20th-century American male artists
American male sculptors
People from Gonzales, Louisiana